Mihai is a Romanian given name for males or a surname. It is equivalent to the English name Michael. A variant of the name is Mihail. Its female form is Mihaela.

As a given name
Mihai I of Romania (1921–2017), King of Romania until 1947
Mihai Antonescu (1904–1946), Romanian politician
Mihai Balan, Moldavian diplomat; father of Dan Balan
Mihai Beniuc, Romanian poet
Mihail G. Boiagi, Aromanian grammarian and professor
Mihai Brediceanu (1920–2005), Romanian composer, conductor, and musicologist
Mihail Celarianu (1893–1985), Romanian poet and novelist
Mihai Ciucă (1883–1969), Romanian bacteriologist and parasitologist
Mihail Cruceanu (1887–1988), Romanian poet
Mihail Davidoglu (1910–1987), Romanian playwright
Mihail Dimonie (1870–1935), Aromanian botanist and teacher
Mihai Eminescu (1850–1889), Romanian poet
Mihail Kogălniceanu (1817–1891), Romanian statesman, lawyer, historian,  and publicist
Mihail Lascăr (1889–1959), Romanian WWII general
Mihai Leu (born 1969), Romanian boxer
Mihai Magdei (born 1945), Moldovan Minister of Health
Mihail Manoilescu (1891–1950), Romanian journalist, engineer, economist, politician, and memoirist
Mihail Moxa (after 1550–before 1650), Wallachian historiographer
Mihai Nadin
Mihai Nechita, Romanian painter
Mihai Paul, Romanian basketball player
Mihai Pelin, Romanian historian
Mihail Sadoveanu (1880–1961), Romanian novelist
Mihail Sebastian, Romanian playwright
Mihail Șerban (disambiguation)
Mihai Silvășan, Romanian basketball coach
Mihail Sturdza, Prince of Romania (1834-1849)
Mihai Trăistariu, Romanian singer
Mihai Răzvan Ungureanu, Romanian historian and former Prime Minister
Mihai Viteazul (1558–1601), Michael the Brave, ruler of Transylvania

As a surname
 Constantin Mihail
 Florența Mihai
 Gheorghe Mihail
 Liviu Mihai

See also 
 Mihailo
 Mihael
 Mihalache (surname)
 Mihăești (disambiguation)
 Mihăiești (disambiguation)
 Mihăileni (disambiguation)
 Mihăilești
 Mihălășeni (disambiguation)
 Mihăileasa River
 Mihăileasca River

Romanian masculine given names
Romanian-language surnames